Yunus Gülnar (born 1 January 1997 in Genk, Belgium) is a Belgium professional football midfielder who last played for KF Vëllaznimi.

Playin career
Gülnar played with the Beşiktaş J.K. U-14 team in the 2010–11 season. Between August 2015 and end of May 2017, he was in contract with Turkish side Kahramanmaraşspor

References

1997 births
Living people
Belgian footballers
Belgian people of Turkish descent
Association football forwards
NK Čelik Zenica players
KF Vëllaznimi players
Sportspeople from Genk
Footballers from Limburg (Belgium)
Belgian expatriate footballers
Expatriate footballers in Bosnia and Herzegovina
Expatriate footballers in Kosovo
Belgian expatriate sportspeople in Bosnia and Herzegovina
Belgian expatriate sportspeople in Kosovo